Tipperary  is the name of:

Places
County Tipperary, a county in Ireland
North Tipperary, a former administrative county based in Nenagh
South Tipperary, a former administrative county based in Clonmel
Tipperary (town), County Tipperary's namesake town
New Tipperary, an area built in the late 19th century for people who had been evicted from Tipperary town
Tipperary Hill, an Irish district in Syracuse, New York, noted for its inverted traffic signal
Tipperary Park, a park in New Westminster, Canada
Tipperary Station, an cattle station in the Northern Territory of Australia
The Tipperary, a historic pub in London, England

Parliamentary constituencies
 Tipperary (Parliament of Ireland constituency) (before 1801)
 Tipperary (UK Parliament constituency) (1801–85)
 Tipperary Mid, North and South (Dáil constituency) (1921–23)
 Tipperary (Dáil constituency) (1923–48, 2016 - present)

Songs
"It's a Long Way to Tipperary"
 "Tipperary" (song)
"I'm Leaving Tipperary", composed by Pat White, sung by The Irish Rovers and others
"Tipperary" by Nellie McKay on Pretty Little Head

Others
Tipperary cheese, a variety of cheddar cheese made in County Tipperary, Ireland
Tipperary (cocktail), a cocktail consisting of Irish whiskey, chartreuse, and vermouth
Tipperary Crystal, a manufacturer of lead crystal and other glass in the Irish county
Tipperary GAA, a sporting association
"Tipperary", a soliloquy by philosopher George Santayana in his 1922 work Soliloquies in England and Later Soliloquies